Complex post-traumatic stress disorder (CPTSD) is a stress-related mental disorder theoretically happening in response to complex traumas, i.e. generally prolonged or repetitive exposures to a series of traumatic events, within which individuals perceive few or no chance to escape. 

CPTSD differs from somatization disorder, dissociative identity disorder, and borderline personality disorder. In the ICD-11 classification, it is a category of post-traumatic stress disorder (PTSD) with three additional clusters of significant symptoms: emotional dysregulations, negative self-beliefs (e.g. feelings of shame, guilt, failure for wrong reasons), and interpersonal difficulties. Examples of CPTSD's symptoms are prolonged feelings of terror, worthlessness, helplessness, distortions in identity or sense of self, and hypervigilance.

There exist strong relationships between CPTSD and repetitive adverse childhood experiences, especially among survivors of harmful foster care. In fact, the trauma model of mental disorders associates CPTSD with chronic or repetitive: sexual, psychological, physical abuse or neglect, intimate partner violences, bullying, kidnapping and hostage situations, indentured servants, slavery or other human trafficking, sweatshop workers, prisoners of war, concentration camp survivors, solitary confinement, defectors from authoritarian religions. The undergone situations generally last during long periods of time. Besides any situations involving captivity or entrapment (i.e. perceived situations lacking of easy and viable escape routes) can lead to CPTSD.

History 
Judith Lewis Herman was the first psychiatrist and scholar to propose Complex Post-Traumatic Stress Disorder (CPTSD) as (new) mental disorder in 1992, within her book Trauma & Recovery and an accompanying article.

Classifications 
The World Health Organization (WHO)'s eleventh revision of the International Statistical Classification of Diseases (ICD-11) has included CPTSD since 2018. Previously the ICD-10 proposed: Enduring Personality Change after Catastrophic Event (EPCACE), which was an ancestor of CPTSD. Besides the United States Department of Veterans Affairs (VA), Healthdirect Australia (HDA) and the British National Health Service (NHS), have also acknowledged CPTSD as mental disorder. However, the American Psychiatric Association (APA) has not included CPTSD yet, in the fifth edition of the Diagnostic and Statistical Manual of Mental Disorders (DSM-5). It has nonetheless proposed: Disorders of Extreme Stress - not otherwise specified (DESNOS) since the DSM-4, which is a mental disorder close to CPTSD.

Symptoms

Children and adolescents 
The diagnosis of PTSD was originally developed for adults who had suffered from a single-event trauma, such as a traumatic experience during a war, or rape. However, the situation for many children is quite different. Children can suffer chronic trauma such as maltreatment, family violence, dysfunction, or a disruption in attachment to their primary caregiver. In many cases, it is the child's caregiver who causes the trauma. The diagnosis of PTSD does not take into account how the developmental stages of children may affect their symptoms and how trauma can affect a child's development.

The term developmental trauma disorder (DTD) has been proposed as the childhood equivalent of CPTSD. This developmental form of trauma places children at risk for developing psychiatric and medical disorders. Bessel van der Kolk explains DTD as numerous encounters with interpersonal trauma such as physical assault, sexual assault, violence or death. It can also be brought on by subjective events such as abandonment, betrayal, defeat or shame.

Repeated traumatization during childhood leads to symptoms that differ from those described for PTSD. Cook and others describe symptoms and behavioral characteristics in seven domains:
 Attachment – "problems with relationship boundaries, lack of trust, social isolation, difficulty perceiving and responding to others' emotional states"
 Biomedical symptoms – sensory-motor developmental dysfunction, sensory-integration difficulties; increased medical problems or even somatization
 Affect or emotional regulation – "poor affect regulation, difficulty identifying and expressing emotions and internal states, and difficulties communicating needs, wants, and wishes"
 Elements of dissociation – "amnesia, depersonalization, discrete states of consciousness with discrete memories, affect, and functioning, and impaired memory for state-based events"
 Behavioral control – "problems with impulse control, aggression, pathological self-soothing, and sleep problems"
 Cognition – "difficulty regulating attention; problems with a variety of 'executive functions' such as planning, judgement, initiation, use of materials, and self-monitoring; difficulty processing new information; difficulty focusing and completing tasks; poor object constancy; problems with 'cause-effect' thinking; and language developmental problems such as a gap between receptive and expressive communication abilities."
 Self-concept – "fragmented and disconnected autobiographical narrative, disturbed body image, low self-esteem, excessive shame, and negative internal working models of self".

Adults 
Adults with CPTSD have sometimes experienced prolonged interpersonal traumatization beginning in childhood, rather than, or as well as, in adulthood. These early injuries interrupt the development of a robust sense of self and of others. Because physical and emotional pain or neglect was often inflicted by attachment figures such as caregivers or older siblings, these individuals may develop a sense that they are fundamentally flawed and that others cannot be relied upon. This can become a pervasive way of relating to others in adult life, described as insecure attachment. This symptom is neither included in the diagnosis of dissociative disorder nor in that of PTSD in the current DSM-5 (2013). Individuals with Complex PTSD also demonstrate lasting personality disturbances with a significant risk of revictimization.

Six clusters of symptoms have been suggested for diagnosis of CPTSD:
 Alterations in regulation of affect and impulses
 Alterations in attention or consciousness
 Alterations in self-perception
 Alterations in relations with others
 Somatization 
 Alterations in systems of meaning

Experiences in these areas may include:
 Changes in emotional regulation, including experiences such as persistent dysphoria, chronic suicidal preoccupation, self-injury, explosive or extremely inhibited anger (may alternate), and compulsive or extremely inhibited sexuality (may alternate).
 Variations in consciousness, such as amnesia or improved recall for traumatic events, episodes of dissociation, depersonalization/derealization, and reliving experiences (either in the form of intrusive PTSD symptoms or in ruminative preoccupation). 
 Changes in self-perception, such as a sense of helplessness or paralysis of initiative, shame, guilt and self-blame, a sense of defilement or stigma, and a sense of being completely different from other human beings (may include a sense of specialness, utter aloneness, a belief that no other person can understand, or a feeling of nonhuman identity).
 Varied changes in perception of the perpetrators, such as a preoccupation with the relationship with a perpetrator (including a preoccupation with revenge), an unrealistic attribution of total power to a perpetrator (though the individual's assessment may be more realistic than the clinician's), idealization or paradoxical gratitude, a sense of a special or supernatural relationship with a perpetrator, and acceptance of a perpetrator's belief system or rationalizations.
 Alterations in relations with others, such as isolation and withdrawal, disruption in intimate relationships, a repeated search for a rescuer (may alternate with isolation and withdrawal), persistent distrust, and repeated failures of self-protection.
 Changes in systems of meaning, such as a loss of sustaining faith and a sense of hopelessness and despair.

Diagnosis 
CPTSD was considered for inclusion in the DSM-IV, but it was finally excluded of the published version in 1994. It was also excluded from the DSM-5, which still lists post-traumatic stress disorder. However the ICD-11 has included CPTSD since 2018 and there exists an official psychometrics for assessing the ICD-11 CPTSD, which is the International Trauma Questionnaire (ITQ).

Differential diagnosis

Post-traumatic stress disorder 

Post-traumatic stress disorder (PTSD) was included in the DSM-III (1980), mainly due to the relatively large numbers of American combat veterans of the Vietnam War who were seeking treatment for the lingering effects of combat stress. In the 1980s, various researchers and clinicians suggested that PTSD might also accurately describe the sequelae of such traumas as child sexual abuse and domestic abuse. However, it was soon suggested that PTSD failed to account for the cluster of symptoms that were often observed in cases of prolonged abuse, particularly that which was perpetrated against children by caregivers during multiple childhood and adolescent developmental stages. Such patients were often extremely difficult to treat with established methods.

PTSD descriptions fail to capture some of the core characteristics of CPTSD. These elements include captivity, psychological fragmentation, the loss of a sense of safety, trust, and self-worth, as well as the tendency to be revictimized. Most importantly, there is a loss of a coherent sense of self: this loss, and the ensuing symptom profile, most pointedly differentiates CPTSD from PTSD.

CPTSD is also characterized by attachment disorder, particularly the pervasive insecure, or disorganized-type attachment. DSM-IV (1994) dissociative disorders and PTSD do not include insecure attachment in their criteria. As a consequence of this aspect of CPTSD, when some adults with CPTSD become parents and confront their own children's attachment needs, they may have particular difficulty in responding sensitively especially to their infants' and young children's routine distress – such as during routine separations, despite these parents' best intentions and efforts. Although the great majority of survivors do not abuse others, this difficulty in parenting may have adverse repercussions for their children's social and emotional development if parents with this condition and their children do not receive appropriate treatment.

Thus, a differentiation between the diagnostic category of CPTSD and that of PTSD has been suggested. CPTSD better describes the pervasive negative impact of chronic repetitive trauma than does PTSD alone. PTSD can exist alongside CPTSD; however a sole diagnosis of PTSD often does not sufficiently encapsulate the breadth of symptoms experienced by those who have experienced prolonged traumatic experience, and therefore CPTSD extends beyond the PTSD parameters.

Continuous traumatic stress disorder (CTSD) differsfrom CPTSD, which was introduced into the trauma literature by Gill Straker (1987). It was originally used by South African clinicians to describe the effects of exposure to frequent, high levels of violence usually associated with civil conflict and political repression. The term is applicable to the effects of exposure to contexts in which gang violence and crime are endemic as well as to the effects of ongoing exposure to life threats in high-risk occupations such as police, fire and emergency services. It has also been used to describe ongoing relationship trauma frequently experienced by people leaving relationships which involved intimate partner violence.

Traumatic grief 

Traumatic grief or complicated mourning are conditions where both trauma and grief coincide. There are conceptual links between trauma and bereavement since loss of a loved one is inherently traumatic. If a traumatic event was life-threatening, but did not result in a death, then it is more likely that the survivor will experience post-traumatic stress symptoms. If a person dies, and the survivor was close to the person who died, then it is more likely that symptoms of grief will also develop. When the death is of a loved one, and was sudden or violent, then both symptoms often coincide. This is likely in children exposed to community violence.

For CPTSD to manifest traumatic grief, the violence would occur under conditions of captivity, loss of control and disempowerment, coinciding with the death of a friend or loved one in life-threatening circumstances. This again is most likely for children and stepchildren who experience prolonged domestic or chronic community violence that ultimately results in the death of friends and loved ones. The phenomenon of the increased risk of violence and death of stepchildren is referred to as the Cinderella effect.

Borderline personality disorder

CPTSD may share some symptoms with both PTSD and borderline personality disorder (BPD). However, there is enough evidence to also differentiate CPTSD from borderline personality disorder.

It may help to understand the intersection of attachment theory with CPTSD and BPD if one reads the following opinion of Bessel A. van der Kolk together with an understanding drawn from a description of BPD:

However, CPTSD and BPD have been found by some researchers to be distinctive disorders with different features. Those with CPTSD do not fear abandonment or have unstable patterns of relations; rather, they withdraw. There are distinct and notably large differences between BPD and CPTSD and while there are some similarities – predominantly in terms of issues with attachment (though this plays out in different ways) and trouble regulating strong emotional affects – the disorders are different in nature. 

In addition, 25% of those diagnosed with BPD have no known history of childhood neglect or abuse and individuals are six times as likely to develop BPD if they have a relative who was diagnosed so compared to those who do not. One conclusion is that there is a genetic predisposition to BPD unrelated to trauma. Researchers conducting a longitudinal investigation of identical twins found that "genetic factors play a major role in individual differences of borderline personality disorder features in Western society." A 2014 study published in European Journal of Psychotraumatology was able to compare and contrast CPTSD, PTSD, Borderline Personality Disorder and found that it could distinguish between individual cases of each and when it was co-morbid, arguing for a case of separate diagnoses for each. BPD may be confused with CPTSD by some without proper knowledge of the two conditions because those with BPD also tend to have PTSD or to have some history of trauma.

In Trauma and Recovery, Herman expresses the additional concern that patients with CPTSD frequently risk being misunderstood as inherently 'dependent', 'masochistic', or 'self-defeating', comparing this attitude to the historical misdiagnosis of female hysteria. However, those who develop CPTSD do so as a result of the intensity of the traumatic bond – in which someone becomes tightly biolo-chemically bound to someone who abuses them and the responses they learned to survive, navigate and deal with the abuse they suffered then become automatic responses, imbedded in their personality over the years of trauma – a normal reaction to an abnormal situation.

Treatment 
While standard evidence-based treatments may be effective for treating post traumatic stress disorder, treating complex PTSD often involves addressing interpersonal relational difficulties and a different set of symptoms which make it more challenging to treat. According to the United States Department of Veteran Affairs:

Children
The utility of PTSD-derived psychotherapies for assisting children with CPTSD is uncertain. This area of diagnosis and treatment calls for caution in use of the category CPTSD. Dr. Julian Ford and Dr. Bessel van der Kolk have suggested that CPTSD may not be as useful a category for diagnosis and treatment of children as a proposed category of developmental trauma disorder (DTD). According to Courtois & Ford, for DTD to be diagnosed it requires a

Since CPTSD or DTD in children is often caused by chronic maltreatment, neglect or abuse in a care-giving relationship the first element of the biopsychosocial system to address is that relationship. This invariably involves some sort of child protection agency. This both widens the range of support that can be given to the child but also the complexity of the situation, since the agency's statutory legal obligations may then need to be enforced.

A number of practical, therapeutic and ethical principles for assessment and intervention have been developed and explored in the field:
 Identifying and addressing threats to the child's or family's safety and stability are the first priority.
 A relational bridge must be developed to engage, retain and maximize the benefit for the child and caregiver.
 Diagnosis, treatment planning and outcome monitoring are always relational (and) strengths based.
 All phases of treatment should aim to enhance self-regulation competencies.
 Determining with whom, when and how to address traumatic memories.
 Preventing and managing relational discontinuities and psychosocial crises.

Adults

Trauma recovery model
Judith Lewis Herman, in her book, Trauma and Recovery, proposed a complex trauma recovery model that occurs in three stages: 
 Establishing safety
 Remembrance and mourning for what was lost
 Reconnecting with community and more broadly, society

Herman believes recovery can only occur within a healing relationship and only if the survivor is empowered by that relationship. This healing relationship need not be romantic or sexual in the colloquial sense of "relationship", however, and can also include relationships with friends, co-workers, one's relatives or children, and the therapeutic relationship. However, the first stage of establishing safety must always include a thorough evaluation of the surroundings, which might include abusive relationships. This stage might involve the need for major life changes for some patients.Securing a safe environment requires strategic attention to the patient's economic and social ecosystem. The patient must become aware of her own resources for practical and emotional support as well as the realistic dangers and vulnerabilities in her social situation. Many patients are unable to move forward in their recovery because of their present involvement in unsafe or oppressive relationships. In order to gain their autonomy and their peace of mind, survivors may have to make difficult and painful life choices. Battered women may lose their homes, their friends, and their livelihood. Survivors of childhood abuse may lose their families. Political refugees may lose their homes and their homeland. The social obstacles to recovery are not generally recognized, but they must be identified and adequately addressed in order for recovery to proceed.Complex trauma means complex reactions and this leads to complex treatments.  Hence, treatment for CPTSD requires a multi-modal approach.

It has been suggested that treatment for complex PTSD should differ from treatment for PTSD by focusing on problems that cause more functional impairment than the PTSD symptoms. These problems include emotional dysregulation, dissociation, and interpersonal problems. Six suggested core components of complex trauma treatment include:
 Safety
 Self-regulation
 Self-reflective information processing
 Traumatic experiences integration
 Relational engagement
 Positive affect enhancement

The above components can be conceptualized as a model with three phases. Every case will not be the same, but one can expect the first phase to consist of teaching adequate coping strategies and addressing safety concerns. The next phase would focus on decreasing avoidance of traumatic stimuli and applying coping skills learned in phase one. The care provider may also begin challenging assumptions about the trauma and introducing alternative narratives about the trauma. The final phase would consist of solidifying what has previously been learned and transferring these strategies to future stressful events.

Neuroscientific and trauma informed interventions 
In practice, the forms of treatment and intervention varies from individual to individual since there is a wide spectrum of childhood experiences of developmental trauma and symptomatology and not all survivors respond positively, uniformly, to the same treatment. Therefore, treatment is generally tailored to the individual. Recent neuroscientific research has shed some light on the impact that severe childhood abuse and neglect (trauma) has on a child's developing brain, specifically as it relates to the development in brain structures, function and connectivity among children from infancy to adulthood. This understanding of the neurophysiological underpinning of complex trauma phenomena is what currently is referred to in the field of traumatology as 'trauma informed' which has become the rationale which has influenced the development of new treatments specifically targeting those with childhood developmental trauma.
Dr. Martin Teicher, a Harvard psychiatrist and researcher, has suggested that the development of specific complex trauma related symptomatology (and in fact the development of many adult onset psychopathologies) may be connected to gender differences and at what stage of childhood development trauma, abuse or neglect occurred. For example, it is well established that the development of dissociative identity disorder among women is often associated with early childhood sexual abuse.

Use of evidence-based treatment and its limitations 
One of the current challenges faced by many survivors of complex trauma (or developmental trauma disorder) is support for treatment since many of the current therapies are relatively expensive and not all forms of therapy or intervention are reimbursed by insurance companies who use evidence-based practice as a criteria for reimbursement. Cognitive behavioral therapy, prolonged exposure therapy and dialectical behavioral therapy are well established forms of evidence-based intervention. These treatments are approved and endorsed by the American Psychiatric Association, the American Psychological Association and the Veteran's Administration.

While standard evidence-based treatments may be effective for treating standard post-traumatic stress disorder, treating complex PTSD often involves addressing interpersonal relational difficulties and a different set of symptoms which make it more challenging to treat. The United States Department of Veterans Affairs acknowledges,

For example, "Limited evidence suggests that predominantly [Cognitive behavioral therapy] CBT [evidence-based] treatments are effective, but do not suffice to achieve satisfactory end states, especially in Complex PTSD populations."

Treatment challenges 
It is widely acknowledged by those who work in the trauma field that there is no one single, standard, 'one size fits all' treatment for complex PTSD. There is also no clear consensus regarding the best treatment among the greater mental health professional community which included clinical psychologists, social workers, licensed therapists (MFTs) and psychiatrists. Although most trauma neuroscientifically informed practitioners understand the importance of utilizing a combination of both 'top down' and 'bottom up' interventions as well as including somatic interventions (sensorimotor psychotherapy or somatic experiencing or yoga) for the purposes of processing and integrating trauma memories.

Survivors with complex trauma often struggle to find a mental health professional who is properly trained in trauma informed practices. They can also be challenging to receive adequate treatment and services to treat a mental health condition which is not universally recognized or well understood by general practitioners.

Allistair and Hull echo the sentiment of many other trauma neuroscience researchers (including Bessel van der Kolk and Bruce D. Perry) who argue: 

Complex post trauma stress disorder is a long term mental health condition which is often difficult and relatively expensive to treat and often requires several years of psychotherapy, modes of intervention and treatment by highly skilled, mental health professionals who specialize in trauma informed modalities designed to process and integrate childhood trauma memories for the purposes of mitigating symptoms and improving the survivor's quality of life. Delaying therapy for people with complex PTSD, whether intentionally or not, can exacerbate the condition.

Recommended treatment modalities and interventions 
There is no one treatment which has been designed specifically for use with the adult complex PTSD population (with the exception of component based psychotherapy) there are many therapeutic interventions used by mental health professionals to treat PTSD. , the American Psychological Association PTSD Guideline Development Panel (GDP) strongly recommends the following for the treatment of PTSD:

 Cognitive behavioral therapy (CBT) and trauma focused CBT
 Cognitive processing therapy (CPT)
 Cognitive therapy (CT)
 Prolonged exposure therapy (PE)

The American Psychological Association also conditionally recommends

 Brief eclectic psychotherapy (BEP)
 Eye movement desensitization and reprocessing (EMDR)
 Narrative exposure therapy (NET)

While these treatments have been recommended, there is still on-going debate regarding the best and most efficacious treatment for complex PTSD. Many commonly used treatments are considered complementary or alternative since there still is a lack of research to classify these approaches as evidence based. Some of these additional interventions and modalities include:
 biofeedback
 dyadic resourcing (used with EMDR)
 emotionally focused therapy
 emotional freedom technique (EFT) or tapping
 equine-assisted therapy
 expressive arts therapy 
 internal family systems therapy
 dialectical behavior therapy (DBT)
 family systems therapy
 group therapy
 neurofeedback
 psychodynamic therapy
 sensorimotor psychotherapy
 somatic experiencing
 yoga, specifically trauma-sensitive yoga

Arguments against diagnosis 
Though acceptance of the idea of complex PTSD has increased with mental health professionals, the fundamental research required for the proper validation of a new disorder is insufficient as of 2013. The disorder was proposed under the name DES-NOS (Disorder of Extreme Stress Not Otherwise Specified) for inclusion in the DSM-IV but was rejected by members of the Diagnostic and Statistical Manual of Mental Disorders (DSM) committee of the American Psychiatric Association for lack of sufficient diagnostic validity research. Chief among the stated limitations was a study which showed that 95% of individuals who could be diagnosed with the proposed DES-NOS were also diagnosable with PTSD, raising questions about the added usefulness of an additional disorder.

Following the failure of DES-NOS to gain formal recognition in the DSM-IV, the concept was re-packaged for children and adolescents and given a new name, developmental trauma disorder. Supporters of DTD appealed to the developers of the DSM-5 to recognize DTD as a new disorder. Just as the developers of DSM-IV refused to included DES-NOS, the developers of DSM-5 refused to include DTD due to a perceived lack of sufficient research.

One of the main justifications offered for this proposed disorder has been that the current system of diagnosing PTSD plus comorbid disorders does not capture the wide array of symptoms in one diagnosis. Because individuals who suffered repeated and prolonged traumas often show PTSD plus other concurrent psychiatric disorders, some researchers have argued that a single broad disorder such as CPTSD provides a better and more parsimonious diagnosis than the current system of PTSD plus concurrent disorders. Conversely, an article published in BioMed Central has posited there is no evidence that being labeled with a single disorder leads to better treatment than being labeled with PTSD plus concurrent disorders.

Complex PTSD embraces a wider range of symptoms relative to PTSD, specifically emphasizing problems of emotional regulation, negative self-concept, and interpersonal problems. Diagnosing complex PTSD can imply that this wider range of symptoms is caused by traumatic experiences, rather than acknowledging any pre-existing experiences of trauma which could lead to a higher risk of experiencing future traumas. It also asserts that this wider range of symptoms and higher risk of traumatization are related by hidden confounder variables and there is no causal relationship between symptoms and trauma experiences.
In the diagnosis of PTSD, the definition of the stressor event is narrowly limited to life-threatening events, with the implication that these are typically sudden and unexpected events. Complex PTSD vastly widened the definition of potential stressor events by calling them adverse events, and deliberating dropping reference to life-threatening, so that experiences can be included such as neglect, emotional abuse, or living in a war zone without having specifically experienced life-threatening events. By broadening the stressor criterion, an article published by the Child and Youth Care Forum claims this has led to confusing differences between competing definitions of complex PTSD, undercutting the clear operationalization of symptoms seen as one of the successes of the DSM.

There are no known case reports with prospective repeated assessments to clearly demonstrate that the alleged symptoms followed the adverse events. Instead, supporters of complex PTSD have pushed for recognition of a disorder before conducting any of the prospective repeated assessments that are needed.

See also

References

Further reading

External links 
 
 APA practice parameters for assessment and treatment for PTSD (Updated 2017)

Anxiety disorders
Post-traumatic stress disorder
Traumatology
Stress-related disorders